China Railway Zhengzhou Group, officially abbreviated as CR Zhengzhou or CR-Zhengzhou, formerly, Zhengzhou Railway Administration is a subsidiaries company under the jurisdiction of the China Railway (formerly the Ministry of Railway). It is in charge of the railways in Henan Province. Before the reform of national railway bureaus in March 2005, it also controlled railways in Hubei, south Shaanxi and south Shanxi. The current director of the bureau is Zhang Junbang.

History
The precedent of Zhengzhou Railway Bureau was Zheng County Railway Station, founded in 1904. It was a station on the railway from Lugouqiao to Hankou. During Chinese Civil War following the end of Sino-Japanese War, Zhengzhou was occupied by the People's Liberation Army on October 22, 1948. Zhengzhou Associated Administration Commission, in charge of Longhai and Pinghan Railways in central China, was subsequently formed. In February 1949, it was renamed Central China Longhai and Pinghan Railways Associated Administration Bureau. In March of the same year, Zhengzhou Railway Management Bureau of Ministry of Railway of Chinese People's Revolutionary Military Commission was founded.

In September 1958, Zhengzhou Railway Bureau of Ministry of Railway was founded. In the following reorganization of railway bureaus, Ministry of Railway merged Wuhan Railway Bureau and Xi'an Railway Bureau into, and separated them from Zhengzhou Bureau several times. In the reform in 2005, Wuhan and Xi'an Bureaus were again separated from Zhengzhou Bureau. Because the railway sections controlled by Zhengzhou Railway Bureau are the intersection of several major railway arteries in mainland China, Zhengzhou emerged into a railway transportation hub in China, and boasts influential status in China's railway history. During Cultural Revolution, Zhengzhou Bureau was once administrated by PLA army to ensure the normal operations.

The railway administration was reorganized as a company in November 2017.

Hub stations
 Zhengzhou
 Luoyang
 , 
 Xinxiang
 
 Shangqiu

Regional services

C-train services

References

External links
Official website of Zhengzhou Railway Bureau

Ministry of Railways of China
Transport in Zhengzhou
Rail transport in Henan
China Railway Corporation